The Pemebonwon River is a  river in the U.S. state of Wisconsin.

It is a tributary of the Menominee River and flows through Marinette County. It is formed by the confluence of its North and South branches. The North Branch contains a waterfall known as Long Slide Falls.

References

Rivers of Wisconsin
Rivers of Marinette County, Wisconsin